Choque de trenes is a 1902 Spanish short black-and-white silent documentary film directed by Segundo de Chomón.

Trivia
The film's title is Spanish for "Train Crash."

See also 
 List of Spanish films before 1930

External links 
 

1902 films
Spanish black-and-white films
Films directed by Segundo de Chomón
Spanish short documentary films
Black-and-white documentary films
Spanish silent short films
1900s short documentary films
Documentary films about transport
Trains